Nifelheim is a Swedish black metal band. The band was formed in 1990 by the twin brothers Erik and Per Gustavsson, under the stage names Tyrant and Hellbutcher and is known for their "old school" style of black metal.

History 
Nifelheim was founded in 1990 and recorded the demo tape Unholy Death between 1992 and 1993. The band signed to Necropolis Records and recorded the debut album Nifelheim at Studio Fredman. During this period the band fired their first guitarist "Morbid Slaughter" for having a girlfriend. After this they were joined by John Zweetsloot and Jon Nödtveidt of Dissection on guitars. The band was banned from the studio.

In 1996, the band recorded the Vulcano cover "Witches Sabbat" with guest vocalist Goat (ex-Satanized) for the second Headbangers Against Disco split EP which also featured Usurper (de) and Unpure, and the song "Hellish Blasphemy" for the Gummo soundtrack; the latter was re-recorded for the band's second album, Devil's Force, which featured Zweetsloot and Nödtveidt again.

After a documentary about heavy metal fans which aired in Sweden in 1998, Tyrant and Hellbutcher were given a nickname "Bröderna Hårdrock" which translates to 'The Heavy Metal Brothers' in English.

In 1998, Nifelheim contributed "Die in Fire" to the Bathory tribute album In Conspiracy with Satan – A Tribute to Bathory (de). The band left Necropolis Records and recorded Servants of Darkness in March 2000, which was released through Black Sun Records. In 2001, the band played their first concert as headliner at the 2heavy4you festival in Sweden, followed by other concerts in Europe.

Musical style and ideology 
Nifelheim plays old-school black metal inspired by bands like Venom, Bathory, Brazilian thrash metal bands Vulcano, Holocausto and Sarcófago and Czech Master's Hammer. The influence of Iron Maiden is also evident in some arrangements.

The band's lyrics treat Satanism and other topics typical for black metal. Eduardo Rivadavia of AllMusic claimed that "While many of the Norwegian black metal bands of the early 1990s were taking themselves so seriously that heinous acts of murder, church burnings, and the like wound up stealing more headlines than their actual music, Sweden's Nifelheim were shrewdly still treating the genre's Satanic silliness with the appropriate tongue-in-cheek tone. On the surface, this was illustrated by their cartoonish album covers and traditional black metal 'uniform,' consisting of the necessary leather and spikes, bullet belts, pentagrams, and inverted crucifixes." Nifelheim rejected this characterization and cited it as a reason for ceasing to give interviews anymore.

Controversy 
In a 2008 interview with Sweden Rock magazine, members of the band were quoted as making derogatory remarks about deceased Metallica bassist Cliff Burton as well as deceased Pantera guitarist Dimebag Darrell; stating "I laughed and pissed on a photo of him" and "Too bad Phil Anselmo didn't die too; that was probably the only time I wished Pantera had actually played", about Burton and Abbott respectively. In a statement released to Blabbermouth.net, the band later verified that they had made and approved the statements before the issue was published.

In a 2010 interview published in Metalion's Slayer (de) fanzine, Tyrant stated that "this 'Dimebag/Burton' fuss that was spammed out as some 'statement' on the internet", and that it disturbed him "more then  ever". Further, he stated that he is "not hating either of these musicians", nor did he intend to "put any disgrace upon their memory". It is unclear if Tyrant was saying the statement was taken out of context, or denying that the statement was ever made. Apparently due to the controversy, that interview has been their last to date. They also mentioned people labeling them as "non-serious" as another reason to not give interviews anymore.

Members 

 Hellbutcher (Per "Pelle" Gustavsson) - vocals
 Tyrant (Erik Gustavsson) - bass
 Blackosh - guitar
 Savage Aggressor (Felipe Plaza Kutzbach) - guitar
 Disintegrator (Eric Ljung) - drums

Discography 
 1993 - Unholy Death (demo)
 1995 - Nifelheim
 1998 - Devil's Force
 1997 - Headbangers Against Disco Vol. 2 (split EP with Usurper [de] and Unpure)
 1997 - "Hellish Blasphemy" on Gummo
 1998 - "Die in Fire" on In Conspiracy with Satan – A Tribute to Bathory (de)
 2000 - Servants of Darkness
 2000 - Unholy Death (EP)
 2003 - 13 Years (compilation)
 2006 - Tribute to Slayer Magazine (split EP with Sadistik Exekution)
 2006 - Thunder Metal (split EP with Vulcano)
 2007 - Envoy of Lucifer
 2014 - Satanatas (Vinyl EP)
 2019 - The Burning Warpath to Hell (Vinyl EP)

References 

Swedish black metal musical groups
Musical groups established in 1990